"Ruby Baby" is a song written by Jerry Leiber and Mike Stoller. It was originally recorded by the Drifters. Their version was released as a single by Atlantic Records (catalog No. 45 1089) in 1956. It peaked at No. 10 on the US Hot R&B chart.

Covers and other versions 
"Ruby Baby" has been covered by many artists including:

 Columbia Records released a remake by Dion in 1962 (catalog No. 4 42662), which was a worldwide success. The single reached No. 2 on the Billboard Hot 100 and peaked at No. 5 on the R&B chart.
 In 1963, Richard Anthony released a cover in the French language, with lyrics by André Salvet and Claude Carrère via Columbia Records (catalog No. ESRF 1391). It was also on the album Richard Anthony via Columbia Records (catalog No. FPX 234) for France, Canada and Italy.
 The Beach Boys released a version on the band's 1993 box set, Good Vibrations: Thirty Years of The Beach Boys, as an outtake from the 1965 Beach Boys' Party! album. There was also a version recorded for their 1976 "comeback" album, 15 Big Ones, which can be found on various bootlegs of that era.
 Korean singer BoA uses samples of this song in her single "Rock with You".
 Canadian band Wednesday scored a hit in Canada with a rock version in 1976.
 BWB performed an instrumental cover of the song on their album Groovin' .
 In 1974, Billy Craddock released a cover that was a No. 2 country hit.  This version was included the album Rub It In. This version crossed over to No. 33 on the Hot 100. It was also released on his 2009 live album Live -N- Kickin'.
 Bobby Darin released a version on the LP 18 Yellow Roses & 11 Other Hits via Capitol Records (catalog No. ST 1942) in 1963.
 Ronnie Dove recorded the song in 1969 for Diamond Records. It went unreleased until it was issued on CD in the late 1980s.
 Donald Fagen of Steely Dan recorded a version on his 1982 solo album The Nightfly.
 Björk Guðmundsdóttir & tríó Guðmundar Ingólfssonar released a version.
 Ronnie Hawkins recorded a version on April 13, 1959. It was released on the LP Ronnie Hawkins by Roulette Records (catalog No. SR 25078) in August 1959.
 A young Miguel Ríos recorded a version on his fifth EP (1963).
 Donald "Buck Dharma" Roeser recorded a version of the song called "Rudy" (available only on his archive set of CDs).
 Del Shannon released a version on the LP Handy Man by Amy Records (mono catalog No. 8003-M and stereo No. 8003-S) in 1964.
 Tony Sheridan & The Beat Brothers released a version.
 Bobby Rydell released a version from the Top Hits of 1963.
 Mitch Ryder released a version from Sings the Hits (1968).
 John Woolley and Just Born released a version during August 1969, which spent 13 weeks on Belgium's Hit Parade in 1970.
 Australian band Ol' 55 released a version as the fourth single from their third studio album Cruisin' for a Bruisin' (1978). The song peaked at No. 36 on the Australian Kent Music Report.

References 

The Beach Boys songs
The Drifters songs
Dion DiMucci songs
Wednesday (band) songs
Billy "Crash" Craddock songs
Ol' 55 (band) songs
Songs written by Jerry Leiber and Mike Stoller
1956 singles
1963 singles
1974 singles
1978 singles
1956 songs
ABC Records singles